The Öndör Khairkhan Mountain (high holy mountain) is a mountain of the Altai Mountains and located in the Bayan-Ölgii Province in Mongolia. It has elevation of 3,914 m (12,841 ft) and permanently snow-capped.

References 

Mountains of Mongolia
Altai Mountains
Bayan-Ölgii Province